Ohio's 15th senatorial district has always been based in Columbus, Ohio.  Currently it comprises central Franklin County. It encompasses Ohio House districts 18, 25 and 26.  It has a Cook PVI of D+25.  Ohio Governor John Kasich represented the district from 1979 to 1982.  Its current Ohio Senator is Democrat Hearcel Craig.  He resides in Columbus, a city located in Franklin, Delaware, and Fairfield counties.

List of senators

External links
Ohio's 15th district senator at the 130th Ohio General Assembly official website

Ohio State Senate districts
John Kasich